is a paralympic athlete from Japan competing mainly in category F11 javelin and long jump events.

Mineho has competed in seven Paralympics winning a total of eleven medals including five gold.  His first games were in 1984 where he won a complete set of medals, gold in the long jump, silver in the triple jump and bronze in the discus as well as competing in the 100m and javelin.  In 1988 he dropped the 100m and competed in the discus, won a bronze medal in the javelin and gold in both the long jump and triple jump.  1992 saw him drop the discus but he still competed in the triple jump won a bronze in the javelin and a third consecutive gold in the long jump. Mineho dropped the triple jump at the 1996 Summer Paralympics concentrating on the long jump and javelin, not only was this the first games he had been beaten in the long jump but he only managed to finish fifth, he did however win the javelin.  He would also compete in the long jump and javelin in both the 2000 and 2004 Summer Paralympics winning bronze in the javelin on both occasions meaning he had won a medal in five consecutive Paralympic javelin competitions.  He could not maintain this and despite only competing in the javelin at the 2008 Summer Paralympics he could only manage sixth place.

References

Paralympic athletes of Japan
Athletes (track and field) at the 1984 Summer Paralympics
Athletes (track and field) at the 1988 Summer Paralympics
Athletes (track and field) at the 1992 Summer Paralympics
Athletes (track and field) at the 1996 Summer Paralympics
Athletes (track and field) at the 2000 Summer Paralympics
Athletes (track and field) at the 2004 Summer Paralympics
Athletes (track and field) at the 2008 Summer Paralympics
Paralympic gold medalists for Japan
Paralympic silver medalists for Japan
Paralympic bronze medalists for Japan
Living people
Medalists at the 1984 Summer Paralympics
Medalists at the 1988 Summer Paralympics
Medalists at the 1992 Summer Paralympics
Medalists at the 1996 Summer Paralympics
Medalists at the 2000 Summer Paralympics
Medalists at the 2004 Summer Paralympics
Year of birth missing (living people)
Paralympic medalists in athletics (track and field)
Japanese male long jumpers
Japanese male triple jumpers
Japanese male javelin throwers
20th-century Japanese people
21st-century Japanese people